This article comprises three sortable tables of the 13 major mountain peaks of the Hawaiian Islands and the U.S. State of Hawaii.  Each of these 13 major summits has at least  of topographic prominence.

The summit of a mountain or hill may be measured in three principal ways:
The topographic elevation of a summit measures the height of the summit above a geodetic sea level.  The first table below ranks the 13 major summits of Hawaii by topographic elevation.
The topographic prominence of a summit is a measure of how high the summit rises above its surroundings.  The second table below ranks the 13 major summits of Hawaii by topographic prominence.
The topographic isolation (or radius of dominance) of a summit measures how far the summit lies from its nearest point of equal elevation.  The third table below ranks the 13 major summits of Hawaii by topographic isolation.



Highest major summits

Of the 13 major summits of Hawaii, Mauna Kea and Mauna Loa exceed  elevation, Haleakalā exceeds , Hualalai exceeds , and 11 peaks exceed  elevation.

Four of these peaks rise on the island of Hawaii, two on Maui, two on Kauai, two on Molokai, two on Oahu, and one on Lānai.

Most prominent summits

Most isolated major summits
Of the 13 major summits of Hawaii, Mauna Kea has  of topographic isolation and four peaks exceed  of topographic isolation.

Gallery

See also

List of mountain peaks of the United States
List of mountain peaks of Alaska
List of mountain peaks of Arizona
List of mountain peaks of California
List of mountain peaks of Colorado

List of mountains of Hawaii
List of the ultra-prominent summits of Hawaii
List of mountain peaks of Idaho
List of mountain peaks of Montana
List of mountain peaks of Nevada
List of mountain peaks of New Mexico
List of mountain peaks of Oregon
List of mountain peaks of Utah
List of mountain peaks of Washington (state)
List of mountain peaks of Wyoming
Hawaii
Geography of Hawaii
Geology of Hawaii
:Category:Mountains of Hawaii
commons:Category:Mountains of Hawaii
Physical geography
Topography
Topographic elevation
Topographic prominence
Topographic isolation

References

Notes

External links

United States Geological Survey (USGS)
Geographic Names Information System @ USGS
United States National Geodetic Survey (NGS)
Geodetic Glossary @ NGS
NGVD 29 to NAVD 88 online elevation converter @ NGS
Survey Marks and Datasheets @ NGS
Bivouac.com
Peakbagger.com
Peaklist.org
Peakware.com
Summitpost.org

 

Lists of landforms of Hawaii
Hawaii, List Of Mountain Peaks Of
Hawaii, List Of Mountain Peaks Of
Hawaii, List Of Mountain Peaks Of
Hawaii, List Of Mountain Peaks Of